Pseudethmia is a genus of moths in the family Depressariidae. It contains only one species, Pseudethmia protuberans, which is endemic to lower elevation deserts of south-eastern California and probably north-eastern Baja California.

References

Ethmiinae
Monotypic moth genera
Moths of North America